M. A. Matin was a Bangladesh Nationalist Party politician and the former member of parliament for Comilla-23 and Chandpur-5.

Career
Matin was elected to parliament from Chandpur-5 as a Bangladesh Nationalist Party candidate in 1991. He lost the 1996 election to Bangladesh Awami League candidate, Rafiqul Islam. He was re-elected from Chandpur-5 in 2001.

He was elected a member of parliament from Undivided Comilla-23 (present Chandpur-5) in the 1979 Bangladeshi general election.

Death 
M. A. Matin died on 26 May 2020.

References

Bangladesh Nationalist Party politicians
2020 deaths
5th Jatiya Sangsad members
6th Jatiya Sangsad members
8th Jatiya Sangsad members
Year of birth missing
2nd Jatiya Sangsad members